Darkest Day is the eighth studio album by the American death metal band Obituary. It was released on June 30, 2009 through Candlelight Records. Darkest Day is the final Obituary album to feature  both longtime bassist Frank Watkins, who had played in the band since Cause of Death (1990), and guitarist Ralph Santolla.

Track listing

Personnel 
Obituary
 John Tardy – vocals
 Ralph Santolla – lead guitar
 Trevor Peres – rhythm guitar
 Frank Watkins – bass
 Donald Tardy – drums

Production
 Andreas Marschall – cover art
 Mark Prator - mixing, production, recording

References 

Obituary (band) albums
2009 albums